Sanga Monastery is a small Tibetan Buddhist monastery located in the town of Dagzê in Dagzê County, Lhasa, Tibet.

Location

Sanga Monastery is located in the center of the old city of Dagzê.
The Lhasa River can be seen from the rear of the monastery.
Diagonally above the monastery on the hillside are the ruins of a hilltop fort.
This is the ruin of Dagtse Dzong, or Dechen Dzong. Dzong means "fort".

History

The monastery was built by Je Tsongkhapa in 1419. 
It is part of the Gelug sect, and is under the jurisdiction of Ganden Monastery.
At its height there were one hundred monks in residence.
During the Cultural Revolution the temple lost many artifacts, and buildings were destroyed.
In November 1986 the monastery was re-opened after repairs.
In 2012 there were over thirty monks in residence. That year a bathhouse was installed for the first time.
The monastery has a greenhouse.

References

Sources

Buddhist monasteries in Lhasa (prefecture-level city)
Buddhist temples in Tibet
Gelug monasteries
Religion in Lhasa
Dagzê County